Francesco Galdenzi (born 16 December 1976) is a retired Italian race walker.

Biography

Achievements

External links
 

1976 births
Living people
Italian male racewalkers
World Athletics Championships athletes for Italy
21st-century Italian people